John Bigg (5 July 1652 –  1710), of Graham, Huntingdonshire, was an English Member of Parliament.

He was the son of Walter Bigg, Member of Parliament for Wallingford.

He was a Member (MP) of the Parliament of England for Huntingdon in 1689.

References

1652 births
1710 deaths
English MPs 1689–1690